Thakali is a Sino-Tibetan language of Nepal spoken by the Thakali people, mainly in the Myagdi and Mustang Districts. Its dialects have limited mutual intelligibility.

Seke (Tangbe, Tetang, Chuksang) is sometimes considered a separate language. Other names and dialect names are Barhagaule, Marpha, Panchgaunle, Puntan Thakali, Syang, Tamhang Thakali, Thaksaatsaye, Thaksatsae, Thaksya, Tukuche, Yhulkasom.

Geographical distribution
Thakali is spoken in the middle of the Kali Gandaki River valley and in the upper part of the Kali Gandaki Gorge (also known as Thak Khola), in Mustang District, Gandaki Province. The Thakali area is bounded by Annapurna Himal on one side and Dhawalagiri Himal on the other, with Tatopani village in the south and Jomsom in the north (Ethnologue).

The Tukuche dialect is spoken from Tukuche to Thaksatsae, in 13 villages: Tukuche, Khanti, Kobang, Larjung, Dampu, Naurikot, Bhurjungkot, Nakung, Tithi, Kunjo, Taglung, Lete, Ghansa. Many live outside the area.

Seke is spoken by Gurung of Chuksang, Tsaile, Tangbe, Tetang, and Gyakar villages of Mustang District, Dhawalagiri Zone. There are only 700 native speakers of this language, 100 of whom live in New York City. Reportedly, half of the New York City speakers live in the same apartment building.

Dialects
Ethnologue lists the following dialects of Thakali.

Tukuche (Tamhang Thakali, Thaksaatsaye, Thaksatsae)
Marpha (Puntan Thakali)
Syang (Yhulkasom)

Seke has the following dialects.
Tangbe
Tetang
Chuksang

References

External links 

Tamangic languages
Languages of Nepal
Languages written in Tibetan script
Languages written in Devanagari